National Highway 46 was a national highway in the Indian state of Tamil Nadu. It ran from Krishnagiri to Walajapet in the state. It passed through Vellore and it was a highly important connecting road for vehicles travelling between Chennai and Bangalore. The Krishnagiri-Walajapet section is being upgraded to six lanes by L&T on a build-operate-transfer basis.

Renumbering
Old national highway 46 has been renumbered as National Highway 48, which runs from Delhi to Chennai via Mumbai and Bangalore.

Route 
Krishnagiri, Bargur, Nattrampalli, Vaniyambadi, Ambur, Pallikonda, Vellore, Arcot, Ranipet and Walajapet.

Gallery

See also 
 National Highways Development Project

References

External links 
 Old NH 46 on OpenStreetMap
 Route map of NH 46

46
46
National highways in India (old numbering)